High Crimes and Misdemeanors: The Case Against Bill Clinton is a 1998 book about Bill Clinton by American conservative media commentator Ann Coulter. It was published by Regnery Publishing. Coulter promoted it on television, and it became a bestseller.

Summary

The book has sections on President Bill Clinton's alleged womanizing at government expense and his alleged lies (under oath) to cover up his actions.
Coulter also writes about some of the other controversies surrounding Bill Clinton's presidency, including Monica Lewinsky, Paula Jones, Whitewater, Travelgate, Filegate, Wampumgate, the China secrets scandal, and the  suicide of Vince Foster. In the last chapter, she reviews the history of the impeachment process and makes a case for Clinton's impeachment.

Publication history
High Crimes and Misdemeanors was first published in hardcover by Regnery Publishing in 1998. A paperback edition followed in 2002.

Reception
High Crimes and Misdemeanors received positive reviews from the journalist Matthew Scully in National Review, the legal scholar Robert Bork in The Wall Street Journal, and the activist James C. Roberts in Human Events. It received mixed reviews from Gilbert Taylor in Booklist and the legal scholar Vikram Amar in Constitutional Commentary and a negative review from The Economist. The book was also discussed by Daisy Maryles of Publishers Weekly.

Scully credited Coulter with providing "a lively and unanswerable case as to the constitutional points". However, he believed that Coulter wrongly blamed Clinton for the "vice and vulgarity of modern culture". He compared the book to the conservative commentator William Bennett's The Death of Outrage (1998). Bork described the book as "readable and informative" and praised its "sprightly style". He agreed with Coulter that "the IRS, headed by a Clinton crony, conducted politically motivated audits of taxpayers."

Roberts believed that Coulter provided a "useful review of the impeachment process in the Anglo-American tradition" and made a compelling case for Clinton's impeachment and removal from office. He also praised Coulter's discussion of the Monica Lewinsky, Paula Jones, and Whitewater scandals. Taylor described the book as "aggressive" and "hot selling", but questioned whether this was because of its content or because of Coulter's "incessant cable TV appearances". He believed that the book's best passages were those about the impeachment process. Amar believed that the book was not "good academic scholarship", but that it should nevertheless interest scholars, since it presented "an interesting, though by no means uncontested" discussion of Clinton's legal and political problems. He believed that Coulter's discussions of "Whitewater, Filegate and the Travel Office episode" were questionable, but that her discussion of the Monica Lewinsky scandal was "better grounded" and provided a good starting point for discussions about the possibility of impeaching Clinton. He believed Coulter was basically correct about the facts of the case but that she provided a weaker discussion of relevant constitutional issues. He also believed that what Coulter was saying was "constitutionally important merely because she has been saying it to so many and such impressionable people".

The Economist wrote that the book "reads like the closing argument of a long trial by a prosecutor who plainly hates the guilty bastard at the defence table" and that it was uneven in quality. It complimented Coulter's discussion of Whitewater, but found her discussion of Wampumgate irrelevant, concluding that "Coulter tries too hard" and that for her "there is nothing that Mr Clinton can do right." According to Maryles, the book became a bestseller. She stated that it "had a 75,000-copy first printing and has been back to press several times, bringing the total to 150,000." She added that in the months after the book's publication, Coulter did 175 radio interviews and 11 television interviews.

See also
 Impeachment of Bill Clinton

References

Bibliography
Books

 

Journals

  
 
  
  
  
 
 

Online articles

External links
Chapter One

1998 non-fiction books
American non-fiction books
Books about the Clinton administration
Books by Ann Coulter
English-language books
Works about the impeachment of Bill Clinton
Regnery Publishing books